Vinji Vrh is a small settlement in the hills southeast of Šmartno pri Litiji in central Slovenia. The area is part of the historical region of Lower Carniola. The Municipality of Šmartno pri Litiji is now included in the Central Slovenia Statistical Region. 

A late Bronze Age and Iron Age hillfort with an associated burial ground has been identified and partially investigated in the settlement.

References

External links
Vinji Vrh at Geopedia

Populated places in the Municipality of Šmartno pri Litiji